Divan Morad-e Olya (also Romanized as Dīvān Morād-e ‘Olyā; also known as Zīārat-e Dīvān Morād-e Bālā and Zīārat-e Dīvān Morād ‘Olyā) is a village in Howmeh Rural District, in the Central District of Kahnuj County, Kerman Province, Iran. At the 2006 census, its population was 56, in 16 families.

References 

Populated places in Kahnuj County